Paris is a city and county seat of Lamar County, Texas, United States. Located in Northeast Texas at the western edge of the Piney Woods, the population of the city was 24,171 in 2020.

History

Present-day Lamar County was part of Red River County during the Republic of Texas. By 1840, population growth necessitated the organization of a new county. George Washington Wright, who had served in the Third Congress of the Republic of Texas as a representative from Red River County, was a major proponent of the new county. The Fifth Congress established the new county on December 17, 1840, and named it after Mirabeau B. Lamar, who was the first Vice President and the second President of the Republic of Texas.

Lamar County was one of the 18 Texas counties that voted against secession on February 23, 1861.

In 1877, 1896, and 1916, major fires in the city forced considerable rebuilding. The 1916 fire destroyed almost half the town and caused an estimated $11 million in property damage. The fire ruined most of the central business district and swept through a residential area. The burned structures included the Federal Building and Post Office, the Lamar County Courthouse and Jail, City Hall, most commercial buildings, and several churches.

In 1893, black teenager Henry Smith was accused of murder, tortured, and then burned to death on a scaffold in front of thousands of spectators in Paris. In 1920, two black brothers from the Arthur family were tied to a flagpole and burned to death at the Paris fairgrounds. The city has prominent memorials to the Confederacy.

In 1943, the U.S. Supreme Court in Largent v. Texas struck down a Paris ordinance that prohibited a person from selling or distributing religious publications without first obtaining a city-issued permit. The Court ruled that the ordinance abridged freedom of religion, freedom of speech, and freedom of the press in violation of the Fourteenth Amendment.

Following a tradition of American cities named "Paris" (named after France's capital), the city commissioned a  replica of the Eiffel Tower in 1993 and installed it on site of the Love Civic Center, southeast of the town square. In 1998, presumably as a response to the 1993 construction of a  tower in Paris, Tennessee, the city placed a giant red cowboy hat atop its tower. The current Eiffel Tower replica is at least the second one; an earlier replica constructed of wood was destroyed by a tornado.

Race relations

Race relations in Paris were described by Newsweek as "turbulent" and sometimes "explosive". In the late-19th and early-20th centuries, several lynchings of African-Americans were staged at the Paris Fairgrounds. A black teenager, Henry Smith, lynched in 1893, was the first in US history captured in photographs. Other lynchings included Irving and Herman Arthur in 1920.

In 2008, an African-American man, Brandon McClelland, was run over and dragged to death by two white men, who were not prosecuted due to lack of evidence. A rally over the death in 2009 had groups shouting "white power" and "black power".

Other incidents included sentencing disparities between black and   white  juveniles, racist flags and graffiti, school discipline disparities, and racist labor practices.

Geography

Paris has a humid subtropical climate (Cfa in the Köppen climate classification). It is located in "Tornado Alley", an area largely centered in the middle of the United States in which tornadoes occur frequently because of weather patterns and geography. Paris is in USDA plant hardiness zone 8a for winter temperatures. This is cooler than its southern neighbor Dallas, and while similar to Atlanta, Georgia, it has warmer summertime temperatures. Snow is not unusual, but is by no means predictable, and years can pass with no snowfall at all.

On April 2, 1982, Paris was hit by an F4 tornado that destroyed more than 1,500 homes, and left 10 people dead, 170 injured, and 3,000 homeless. The damage toll from this tornado was estimated at US$50 million in 1982.

Climate

According to the Köppen Climate Classification system, Paris has a humid subtropical climate, abbreviated "Cfa" on climate maps.

Demographics

From a 1880 United States census population of 3,980, the population of the city of Paris increased to 25,898 at the 2000 census; in 2020, however, its population declined to 24,171.

In 2010, 25,171 people 10,306 households, and 6,426 families resided in the city. The population density was 588.1 people per square mile (227.4/km); the 11,883 housing units averaged 277.6 per square mile (107.3/km). of all households were made up of individuals, and 15.2% had someone living alone who was 65 or older. The average household size was 2.38 and the average family size was 3.01. In the city, the population was distributed as 25.0% under 18, 10.6% from 18 to 24, 24.1% from 25 to 44, 23.8% from 45 to 64, and 16.6% who were 65 or older. The median age was 37.1 years. For every 100 females, there were 87.3 males. For every 100 females 18 and over, there were 82.9 males.

By 2020, the city had 10,522 households according to the American Community Survey, and 3,549 were married-couple households. The average household size was 2.29, and the average family size was 2.99. Of its 2020 population, 933 were foreign-born nationals, 18.9% of whom were naturalized U.S. citizens. As of the census estimates, 49.6% of housing units were owner-occupied and 50.4% were renter-occupied.

In 2010, according to the U.S. Census Bureau, the racial makeup of the city was 70.3% White, 24.8% Black and African American, 3.1% American Indian and Alaska Native, 1.1% Asian, and 4.1% from other races. Hispanics or Latinos of any race were 8.2% of the population. In 2020, its racial and ethnic makeup was 56.6% non-Hispanic White, 23.06% Black and African American, 1.35% Native American, 1.42% Asian, 0.08% Pacific Islander, 0.23% some other race, 5.38% multiracial, and 11.88% Hispanic or Latino of any race, reflecting demographic trends of greater diversification.

Economy

In the past, Paris was a major cotton exchange, and the county was developed as cotton plantations. While cotton is still farmed on the lands around Paris, it is no longer a major part of the economy.

Paris' one major hospital has two campuses: Paris Regional Medical Center South (formerly St. Joseph's Hospital) and Paris Regional Medical Center North (formerly McCuistion Regional Medical Center). It serves as the center of healthcare for much of Northeast Texas and Southeast Oklahoma. Both campuses are now operated jointly under the name of the Paris Regional Medical Center, a division of Essent Healthcare. Paris Regional Medical Center South Campus has recently closed and only the North Campus remains open. The health network is one of the largest employers in the Paris area.

Outside of healthcare, the largest employers are Kimberly-Clark and Campbell Soup.

Note: PRMC is Paris Regional Medical Center.

Arts and culture

The city is home to several late-19th to mid-20th century stately homes. Among these is the Rufus Fenner Scott Mansion, designed by German architect J.L. Wees and constructed in 1910. The structure is solid concrete and steel with four floors. Rufus Scott was a prominent businessman known for shipping, imports, and banking. He was well known by local farmers, who bought aging transport mules from him. The Scott Mansion narrowly survived the fire of 1916. After the fire, Scott brought the architect Wees back to Paris to redesign the historic downtown area.
 Pat Mayse Lake
 Beaver's Bend Resort Park (Oklahoma)
 Evergreen Cemetery – Located on the south side of town, there are over 50,000 people interred. Pitts Chisum's more famous brother, John Chisum, is also buried in the city.
 Sam Bell Maxey House – Maxey was a Confederate general and 2 time US Senator.
 Paris Eiffel Tower
 On October 4, 1955, early in his career, Elvis Presley performed at the Boys Club Gymnasium at 1530 1st Street Northeast in Paris as a member of the Louisiana Hayride Jamboree tour.
 Lamar County Historical Museum

Government

Paris is governed by a city council as specified in the city's charter adopted in 1948.

Paris is represented in the Texas Senate by Republican Bryan Hughes, District 1, and in the Texas House of Representatives by Republican Gary VanDeaver, District 1.

The Texas Department of Criminal Justice operates the Paris District Parole Office

At the federal level, the two U.S. senators from Texas are Republicans John Cornyn and Ted Cruz. Paris is part of Texas's 4th congressional district, represented by Republican Pat Fallon.

The United States Postal Service operates the Paris Post Office.

Education

Elementary and secondary education is split among three main school districts:
 Paris Independent School District 
 North Lamar Independent School District 
 Chisum Independent School District

Prairiland ISD also serves a small portion of the town, along with Blossom ISD.

In addition, Paris Junior College provides postsecondary education. It hosts the Texas Institute of Jewelry Technology, a well-respected school of gemology, horology, and jewelry. The Industrial Technology Division offers programs in air conditioning technology, refrigeration technology, agricultural technology, drafting and computer-aided design, electronics, electromechanical technology, and welding technology.

Texas A&M University-Commerce, a major university of over 12,000 students, is located in the neighboring city of Commerce, 40 miles southwest of Paris.

The Paris Public Library serves Paris, as does the Lamar County Genealogical Society Library.

Infrastructure

Transportation
Paris has long been a railroad center. The Texas and Pacific reached town in 1876; the Gulf, Colorado and Santa Fe Railway (later merged into the Atchison, Topeka and Santa Fe Railway) and the Frisco in 1887; the Texas Midland Railroad (later Southern Pacific) in 1894; and the Paris and Mount Pleasant (Pa-Ma Line) in 1910. Paris Union Station, built 1912, served Frisco, Santa Fe, and Texas Midland passenger trains until 1956. Today, the station is used by the Lamar County Chamber of Commerce and serves as the research library for the Lamar County Genealogical Society.

Major highways
 U.S. Highway 82
 U.S. Highway 271
  State Highway 19/State Highway 24
 State Highway Loop 286

According to the Texas Transportation Commission, Paris is the second-largest city in Texas without a four-lane divided highway connecting to an interstate highway within the state. However, those traveling north of the city can go into the Midwest on a four-lane thoroughfare via US 271 across the Red River into Oklahoma, and then the Indian Nation Turnpike from Hugo to Interstate 40 at Henryetta, which in turn continues as a free four-lane highway via US 75 to Tulsa.

Paris is served by two taxicab companies. Cox Field provides general aviation services.

Notable people

 Duane Allen, member of the Oak Ridge Boys
 Tia Ballard, actress for Funimation Entertainment
 Charles Baxter, physician, attended President Kennedy after he was fatally shot
 Raymond Berry, professional football Hall of Famer
 Tyler Bryant, blues rock guitarist
 John Chisum, cattle baron 
 Gary B.B. Coleman, soul blues guitarist, singer, songwriter and record producer
 Marsha Farney, Republican member of the Texas House of Representatives from Williamson County; reared in Paris, graduated from Paris Junior College, and taught school in Paris in 1990s 
 Bobby Jack Floyd, National Football League (NFL) fullback
 Charles R. Floyd, three-term Democratic state senator; pioneer of the Texas farm-to-market road system and an original founder of Paris Junior College
 Cas Haley, singer/musician, NBC's season two of America's Got Talent runner-up
 Al Haynes, commercial airline pilot, captain during the United Airlines Flight 232 crash
 William Henry Huddle, Texas Capitol artist
 Charlie Jackson, NFL football player
 Frank Jackson, NFL football player
 Frank James, outlaw and brother of Jesse James
 General John P. Jumper, Chief of Staff of the United States Air Force from 2001 to 2005
 Robert Matteson Johnston, Harvard Professor, historian of Napoleon and France.
 Richard Gordon Kendall (1933–2008) self-taught outsider folk artist
 Beverly Leech, actress, portrayed Kate Monday on Mathnet
 Samuel Bell Maxey, United States Senator and Confederate Major General
 Gordon McLendon, pioneer radio broadcaster and founder of the Liberty Broadcasting System
 Jay Hunter Morris, operatic tenor
 John Morris, actor
 Robert Nelson (1920–1985), NFL professional football player
 John Osteen, pastor
 Dave Philley, professional baseball player and holder of five MLB records
 Bass Reeves, the first black deputy U.S. marshal to serve west of the Mississippi River, was based in Paris for four years in the late 19th century
 Admiral James O. Richardson, United States Navy Fleet Commander 1940–1941
 Eddie Robinson, professional baseball player, four-time All-Star and Texas Rangers executive
 Augusta Rucker, medical doctor, zoologist, public health lecturer
 Jack Russell, professional baseball player and first relief pitcher selected to a Major League Baseball All-Star Game
 Leslie Satcher, country music recording artist
 William Scott Scudder, Major League Baseball pitcher
 Gene Stallings, Alabama head coach 1990–1996
 Steven H. Tallant, president of Texas A&M University-Kingsville
 Starke Taylor, mayor of Dallas and businessman
 Shangela Laquifa Wadley, comedian, reality television personality, and drag performer

Notes

References

External links

 City of Paris

 
Cities in Texas
Cities in Lamar County, Texas
County seats in Texas
Micropolitan areas of Texas
1844 establishments in the Republic of Texas
Populated places established in 1844